The volleyball competitions at the 2007 Pan American Games were held from 14 to 19 July  for the women and from 23 to 28 July for the men. The competitions were held at Ginásio do Maracanãzinho, located near the Estádio do Maracanã.

Competition format
In both the men's and the women's competition eight teams participated of the tournament. The teams were divided in two groups of four teams each. The teams played against each other once within their groups. The two best placed teams of each group advanced to the semifinals. The teams which finished in the third and fourth place of their groups competed for the fifth and seventh places, playing the third-placed team of a group against the fourth-placed team of the other group. The winners competed for the fifth place and the losers competed for the seventh place. The semifinal winners competed for the gold medal while the losers competed for the bronze medal.

Men's tournament

Participating teams

Squads

Preliminary round

Group A

 23 July

 24 July

 25 July

Group B

 23 July

 24 July

 25 July

Consolation round

Classification match (5th/8th place)
 27 July

Classification match (7th/8th place)
 28 July

Classification match (5th/6th place)
 28 July

Final round

Semifinals
 27 July

Bronze medal match
 28 July

Gold medal match
 28 July

Final standings

Individual awards

 Most Valuable Player
  Gilberto Godoy
 Best Attacker
  Sean Rooney
 Best Scorer
  Héctor Soto
 Best Defender
  Gregory Berrios
 Best Setter
  Marcelo Elgarten

 Best Server
  Delano Thomas
 Best Receiver
  Sérgio Santos
 Best Libero
  Sérgio Santos
 Best Blocker
  Roberlandy Simon

Women's tournament

Participating teams

Squads

Preliminary round

Group A

 14 July

 15 July

 16 July

Group B

 14 July

 15 July

 16 July

Consolation round

Classification match (5th/8th place)
 18 July

Classification match (7th/8th place)
 19 July

Classification match (5th/6th place)
 19 July

Final round

Semifinals
 18 July

Bronze medal match
 19 July

Gold medal match
 19 July

Final standings

Individual awards

 Most Valuable Player
  Nancy Carrillo
 Best Attacker
  Daimí Ramírez
 Best Scorer
  Bethania de la Cruz
 Best Defender
  Deborah Seilhamer
 Best Setter
  Hélia Souza

 Best Server
  Tayyiba Haneef
 Best Receiver
  Áurea Cruz
 Best Libero
  Carmen Rosa Caso
 Best Blocker
  Cindy Rondón

Notes
 The time of each game above, is listed in UTC-3, Brazilian official time.

Beach

Men's tournament

Women's tournament

External links
 NORCECA
 2007 Pan American Games Official Site

 
2007
Pan American Games
Events at the 2007 Pan American Games